Procinonide (developmental code RS-2362; also known as fluocinolone acetonide propionate) is a synthetic glucocorticoid corticosteroid which was never marketed.

References

Acetonides
Secondary alcohols
Corticosteroid cyclic ketals
Corticosteroid esters
Organofluorides
Glucocorticoids
Pregnanes
Propionate esters
Diketones
Abandoned drugs